Tumsar Town railway station serves Tumsar city and nearby area in Bhandara district in Maharashtra, India. Its station code is TMS.

References

Bhandara district
Railway stations in Bhandara district
Nagpur SEC railway division